John Karl Baldischwiler (born January 19, 1956) is a former National Football League tackle who played nine seasons in the NFL from 1978–1986. He has a son (Matt) and a daughter (Elizabeth) both in their 20s. . He is currently a principal engineer at a civil engineering consulting firm in Oklahoma City.

References

1956 births
Living people
People from Okmulgee, Oklahoma
Players of American football from Oklahoma
American football offensive tackles
Oklahoma Sooners football players
Detroit Lions players
Baltimore Colts players
Indianapolis Colts players
Ed Block Courage Award recipients